is a type of cured , a processed seafood product common in Japanese cuisine.

Production and uses
 is made by forming various pureed deboned white fish with either natural or man-made additives and flavorings into distinctive loaves, which are then steamed until fully cooked and firm.

Rough equivalents are fish paste, fish loaf, fish cake, and fish sausage.<ref name="tsuji">{{cite book |last1=Tsuji |first1=Shizuo |title=Japanese Cooking: A Simple Art |url=https://archive.org/details/japanesecookings00tsuj |url-access=registration |date=1980 |publisher=Kodansha International |location=New York |page=69 |quote=In English it is variously called fish cake, fish loaf, fish paste, and fish sausage. None of these terms is really accurate. As with many different foods, the foreign word is the best to use.}}</ref> , chef and author, recommends using the Japanese name in English, similar to English usage of the word sushi.  has been made in Japan since the 14th century and is now available nearly worldwide.

Red-skinned and white  are typically served at celebratory and holiday meals, as red and white are considered to bring good luck. In Japan, the prepackaged snack  (cheese plus ) is commonly sold in convenience stores. In the city of Uwajima, a type of fried  called  is popular. In Miyagi Prefecture,  is a regional  variation, pale white in colour, formed in the shape of bamboo leaves and often lightly grilled immediately prior to serving.

 Composition 
 Choice of fish 
Early  was made with minced catfish (Silurus asotus). 

The white fish used to make  include:

 Chicken grunt (Parapristipoma trilineatum)
 Golden threadfin bream (Nemipterus virgatus)
 Lizardfish (Synodontidae)
 Japanese gissu (Pterothrissus gissu)
 Various shark species (Selachimorpha)
 Alaska pollock (Theragra chalcogramma)
 White croaker (Pennahia argentata)
 Nibe croaker (Nibea mitsukurii)
 Daggertooth pike conger (Muraenesox cinereus)
 Gnomefish (Scombrops boops)
 Black bass
 Smallmouth bass (Micropterus dolomieu)
 Largemouth bass (Micropterus salmoides)
 Florida black bass (Micropterus floridanus)

  Day 
The  organization of Japan specified November 15 for  Day, established in 1983.

Outside Japan
 Hawaii 
In Hawaii, pink or red-skinned  is readily available in grocery stores. It is a staple of saimin, a popular noodle soup created in Hawaii from the blending of Chinese and Japanese ingredients.  is sometimes referred to as fish cake'' in English.

After World War II, surplus Quonset huts became popular as housing in Hawaii.

See also

  (grilled )
 Fish ball (boiled )
  (boiled )
  (deep-fried )

References

External links
Suzuhiro Kamaboko - How to make Kamaboko

Japanese cuisine
Surimi
Japanese cuisine terms
Food paste